Quadrumana is an outdated taxonomic division within the primates. The division of "Quadrumana" from "Bimana" was an attempt at distinguishing Homo sapiens from the rest of the great apes. For a century, modern science has considered humans as part of the great apes.

Quadrumana is Latin for "four-handed ones", which was a term used for Lemurs, monkeys and apes since their feet are prehensile and similar to hands. It was not clear at the time that Tarsiers belonged as well in this group, as sister of the monkeys (incl. apes). A similar term, quadrumanous, is used to describe locomotion involving both using feet and using hands to grasp at branches. Bimana is Latin for "two-handed ones".

The division was proposed by Johann Friedrich Blumenbach in the first edition of his Manual of Natural History (1779) and taken up by other naturalists, most notably Georges Cuvier. Some elevated the distinction to the level of an order.

However, the many affinities between humans and other primates – and especially the great apes – made it clear that the distinction made no scientific sense. In 1863, however, Thomas Henry Huxley in his Evidence as to Man's Place in Nature demonstrated that the higher apes might fairly be included in Bimana. Charles Darwin wrote, in The Descent of Man (1871):

References

External links
 Excerpts from the Royal Society Yearbook, 1861, give the context of urgent discussions of features distinguishing humans from "Quadrumana", in the wake of Darwin's On the Origin of Species
Carter Blake, in Edinburgh Review (April 1863): Use of "Quadrumana" in an essay beginning "The disputes with regard to the precise affinity and relations of man to the lower animals have now excited so much acrimony, and have assumed such proportions, that we feel at length compelled to offer an opinion upon this controversy."

Obsolete primate taxa